Lukáš Landovský (born 11 August 1994) is a professional Czech football player who currently plays for FK Baumit Jablonec.

References

External links
 
 

Czech footballers
1994 births
Living people
Czech Republic youth international footballers
Czech First League players
FK Jablonec players
FK Varnsdorf players
Association football defenders